USNS Pomeroy (T-AKR-316) is one of Military Sealift Command's nineteen Large, Medium-Speed Roll-on/Roll-off Ships and is part of the 33 ships in the Prepositioning Program. She is a Watson-class vehicle cargo ship named for Private First Class Ralph E. Pomeroy, a Medal of Honor recipient.

Laid down on 25 April 2000 and launched on 10 March 2001, Pomeroy was put into service in the Pacific Ocean on 14 August 2001.

According to The Guardian the human rights group Reprieve identified the Pomeroy and sixteen other USN vessels as having held "ghost prisoners" in clandestine extrajudicial detention.

References

External links

 Photo gallery at navsource.org

 

Watson-class vehicle cargo ships
Ships built in San Diego
2001 ships